The Entrance to the Grand Canal, Venice, is an  oil painting on canvas by the Venetian painter Canaletto. It is a Rococo landscape painting measuring  currently held as part of the Robert Lee Blaffer Memorial Collection in the Audrey Jones Beck Building at the Museum of Fine Arts, Houston, in Houston, Texas. It was a gift from Sarah Campbell Blaffer.

The large church at the left of the painting is the Basilica of Santa Maria della Salute. A variant of the painting with a larger church tower and an additional building is used as the Venetian screen in the 2001 video game Merchant Prince II.

References

1730 paintings
Paintings of Venice by Canaletto
Paintings in the collection of the Museum of Fine Arts, Houston
Maritime paintings
Paintings of Venice